Mitsubishi Outlander, an SUV originally known as the Mitsubishi Airtrek
 Mitsubishi Airtrek (China), an SUV manufactured for the Chinese market from 2021